Sung Jusik (Korean: 성주식; Hanja:成周寔; 1891 - 1959) is a Korean soldier, socialist independence activist at the time of Korea under Japanese rule and politician of the Democratic People's Republic of Korea.

In the time of Korea under Japanese rule, he was in Korean Volunteers Army and the Provisional Government of the Republic of Korea, and after liberation, he participated in the Democratic National Front and the left-right coalition movement.

See also 
Kim Won-bong
Provisional Government of the Republic of Korea
Korean National Revolutionary Party
Left-Right Coalition Movement in Korean peninsula

References 
 Sung Jusik(成周寔, 1891~1959) Encyclopedia of Korean culture - Academy of Korean Studies
 Britannica - Sung Jusik

1891 births
1959 deaths
North Korean politicians
Korean independence activists